Sergem is a Tibetan food made from milk once the butter from the milk is extracted. It is then put in a vessel and heated and when it is about to boil, sour liquid call "chakeu" is added and this leads to the separation of sergem from that milk. One can also prepare a soup out of sergem, add sergem to an achaar, or eat it with momo.

See also
 List of dairy products
 List of Tibetan dishes

Dairy products
Tibetan cuisine